Million Eyes may refer to:

"Million Eyes" (Loïc Nottet song), 2016
"Million Eyes" (The Coral song), 2016

See also
The Beast with a Million Eyes, 1955 independently made science fiction film produced and directed by David Kramarsky
The Million Eyes of Sumuru, 1967 British spy film directed by Lindsay Shonteff